Grevillea shuttleworthiana is a species of flowering plant in the family Proteaceae and is endemic to the south-west of Western Australia. It is a more or less erect shrub with variably-shaped leaves, the shape depending on subspecies, and cylindrical clusters of cream-coloured to yellow or greenish flowers, often held above the foliage.

Description
The two surfaces are similar to each other, except that the veins are usually prominent on the lower surface, sometimes glaucous, sometimes slightly hairy.

This grevillea is similar to Grevillea integrifolia but has ridged branchlets.

Taxonomy
Grevillea shuttleworthiana was first formally described in 1848 by Carl Meissner in Lehmann's Plantae Preissianae from specimens collected by James Drummond in the Swan River Colony. The specific epithet (shuttleworthiana) honours Robert James Shuttleworth.

In 1994, Peter M. Olde and Neil R. Marriott described three subspecies of G. shuttleworthiana in The Grevillea Book, and the names are accepted by the Australian Plant Census:
Grevillea shuttleworthiana subsp. obovata Benth.

Distribution
Grevillea shuttleworthiana grows on sandy soil, loam, gravel or laterite in low heath from Kalbarri in the north to as far south as Ravensthorpe.

Subspecies carinata is found between Binnu, Mullering Brook (in Badgingarra National Park) and Piawaning in the Avon Wheatbelt, Geraldton Sandplains, Jarrah Forest, Mallee and Swan Coastal Plain bioregions, 

Subspecies obovata occurs between Mount Jackson, Bronti (near Yellowdine), the Ravensthorpe Range and Lake Grace in the Avon Wheatbelt, Coolgardie, Esperance Plains and Mallee bioregions.

Subspecies shuttleworthiana grows between Perenjori and Bonnie Rock, south to Yorkrakine in the Avon Wheatbelt, Geraldton Sandplains and Mallee bioregions of south-western Western Australia.

Conservation status
All three subspecies of G. shuttleworthiana are listed as "not threatened" by the Western Australian Government Department of Biodiversity, Conservation and Attractions.

See also
 List of Grevillea species

References

shuttleworthiana
Endemic flora of Western Australia
Eudicots of Western Australia
Proteales of Australia
Taxa named by Carl Meissner
Plants described in 1848